Howard Kevin Tamati  (born 3 January 1953), generally known as Howie Tamati, is a New Zealand politician and former professional rugby league footballer and coach who played for New Zealand. He is the cousin of fellow international Kevin Tamati.

Early life and family
Tamati was born in Waitara on 3 January 1953, the son of Emse and Kingi Tamati. Of Māori descent, he affiliates to the Te Āti Awa, Ngāti Mutunga and Ngāi Tahu iwi. He was educated at Waitara High School. Tamati is the cousin of Kevin Tamati. 

Howie Tamati and Joanne Smith had children. He is married to Aroaro and had four children.

Rugby league career

Player
Tamati played for the Waitara Bears and represented Taranaki locally before selected for the Kiwis in 1979. Tamati played a total of 50 games for the Kiwis, including 24 tests for them between 1979 and 1985.

Tamati played for Wigan between 1983 and 1984. He played against his cousin in the final of the 1984 Challenge Cup.

Coach
Tamati began his coaching career with the Wellington side. He then coached the New Zealand side for two years from 1992. He was replaced in 1994 by Frank Endacott.

Tamati coached the Taranaki Rockets in the 1996 Lion Red Cup and the 1997 Super League Challenge Cup.

In 1997 he was appointed the coach of the Oceania Nines Fiji national team.

Since 2007 he has been the convener of the New Zealand Kiwis selectors.

Administrator
Tamati currently serves as the Chairman of the New Zealand Māori Rugby League starting in 2004.

Tamati was the CEO of Sport Taranaki from 1994-2019. In 2013 he was appointed the president of  New Zealand Rugby League.

Political career
Tamati served three terms as a New Plymouth District Councillor from 1999 to 2007.  He was re-elected as a councillor in October 2010. He is the former chairman of Te Ihi Tu Maori Prisoner Habilitation Centre in New Plymouth.

In 2016 he announced he would not seek re-election to the council in 2015 and won the Māori Party nomination for the Te Tai Hauāuru electorate in the 2017 New Zealand general election.

Honours and awards
In 1990, Tamati was awarded the New Zealand 1990 Commemoration Medal. In the 1994 New Year Honours, he was appointed a Member of the Order of the British Empire, for services to rugby league.

Tamati was selected as the patron of New Zealand Police recruitment wing 245 in 2007. In 2008, he was named in the Taranaki Rugby League Team of the Century.

References

External links
NZRL Roll of Honour
Profile at CherryandWhite.co.uk

1953 births
Living people
21st-century New Zealand politicians
Central Districts rugby league team players
Fiji national rugby league team coaches
Junior Kiwis coaches
Local politicians in New Zealand
Māori Party politicians
New Zealand Māori rugby league players
New Zealand Māori rugby league team players
New Zealand Members of the Order of the British Empire
New Zealand national rugby league team captains
New Zealand national rugby league team coaches
New Zealand national rugby league team players
New Zealand rugby league administrators
New Zealand rugby league coaches
New Zealand rugby league players
New Zealand sportsperson-politicians
Ngāi Tahu people
Ngāti Mutunga people
People educated at Waitara High School
Rugby league hookers
Rugby league players from Waitara, New Zealand
Taranaki rugby league team coaches
Taranaki rugby league team players
Te Āti Awa people
Unsuccessful candidates in the 2017 New Zealand general election
Waitara Bears players
Wellington rugby league team coaches
Wigan Warriors players